Acceleration of Suguri X Edition is a 2011 Japanese fighting video game developed by Japanese indie game developer Orange Juice. It was made for the PlayStation Network and later ported to Microsoft Windows in the Suguri Collection on Steam.

Plot

Reception

References

External links
Official website
Suguri Collection at Rockin' Android

2011 video games
Indie video games
Fighting games
PlayStation 3 games
Video games developed in Japan
Windows games